"The Other Day I Met a Bear" (also known as "The Bear in the Forest" or "Bear in Tennis Shoes") is a traditional Japanese-American camp song, sung as an echo song.

The music was composed in 1919 by Carey Morgan and Lee David to accompany lyrics for "Sipping Cider Through a Straw". A similar or related tune is used for "Princess Pat".

Lyrics 
The traditional lyrics are:

Some versions include a verse before the last stanza: 

I heard a crack,
And then a crunch.
And then I was
That big bears lunch!

Some versions also include the following lines after the last stanza:

The "Bear in Tennis Shoes" version starts with the following lines:

This version ends with:

Other uses 
"The Other Day I Met a Bear" is one of the songs sung by Barney the dinosaur on the 1990 children's video Campfire Sing-along except it was shortened to 4 stanzas instead of 10. On Barney & Friends, the tune was used for The Exercise Song. The 2007 album For the Kids Three! includes a version of the song by Barenaked Ladies.

In Japanese, the song is known as "Mori no Kuma-san" ( or ), with lyrics written by Yoshihiro Baba. It is on the soundtrack to the film version of Ranma ½ (1989) and an instrumental version is used frequently in the Family Stadium video game series.

References

External links
 Lyrics from NIEHS, National Institute of Health.

American songs
Japanese songs
1919 songs
Songs written by Carey Morgan